Buchananius is a genus of flower weevils in the beetle family Curculionidae. There are nine described species in Buchananius.

Species
 Buchananius carinifer Kissinger, 1957
 Buchananius costatus Kissinger, 1957
 Buchananius crispus Kissinger, 1957
 Buchananius minutissimus Kissinger, 1957
 Buchananius neglectus Kissinger, 1957
 Buchananius quadriguttatus Kissinger, 1957
 Buchananius seriatus Kissinger, 1957
 Buchananius striatus (LeConte, 1876)
 Buchananius sulcatus (LeConte, 1876)

References

Further reading

 

Baridinae
Articles created by Qbugbot